Pallikkere Islamic English Medium Higher Secondary is the one of the famous school in Kasaragode District of Kerala. Thousands of students from the many part of the district are studying here. It is situated in Pallikkere merely near to the Bekal Fort.

References 

1985 establishments in Kerala
Educational institutions established in 1985
High schools and secondary schools in Kerala
Schools in Kasaragod district
Islamic schools in India